Francis Richard Henry Penn Curzon, 5th Earl Howe,  (1 May 1884, Mayfair, London – 26 July 1964, Amersham, Buckinghamshire), styled as Viscount Curzon from 1900 to 1929, was a British naval officer, Member of Parliament, and motor racing driver and promoter. In the 1918 UK General Election he won the Battersea South seat as the candidate of the Conservative Party, which he held until 1929. While in Parliament he took up motor racing, and later won the 1931 24 Hours of Le Mans race. He ascended to the Peerage in 1929, succeeding his father as the 5th Earl Howe. Earl Howe co-founded the British Racing Drivers' Club with Dudley Benjafield in 1928, and served as its president until his death in 1964.

Early career

Francis, Viscount Curzon, joined the Royal Naval Reserve after leaving school, following in a long family tradition. 28 October 1907, Lieutenant Viscount Curzon, RNVR, formerly of the London Division, was appointed Commanding Officer of the Sussex Division of the Royal Naval Volunteer Reserve in Hove, Sussex, with the rank of Commander RNVR. When World War I started the RNVR was formed into the Royal Naval Division and they were to fight on land like infantrymen not sailors. Commander the Rt. Hon. Viscount Curzon served as Battalion Commander, Howe Battalion of the 2nd Brigade RND. Howe Battalion saw action at Gallipoli, April 1915 – January 1916; Mudros and Stavros, Salonica, January - May 1916; France and Belgium, May 1916 - February 1918, when the battalion was disbanded. During part of this period Curzon also served as aide-de-camp to George V.

During the First World War, as a keen film maker, he organised the cinematograph service for the Navy. (See: The Scotsman - Wednesday 24 May 1922 p 19 col 3). He took the cinematograph film of the surrender of the German fleet at Scapa Flow from the deck of H.M.S. Queen Elizabeth (The Bioscope - Thursday 28 November 1918 P 6 col 2 "Gossip and Opinions" and https://www.gettyimages.co.uk/detail/news-photo/surrender-of-german-fleet-at-scapa-flow-in-the-orkneys-news-photo/3139960).

Following the armistice Viscount Curzon moved into politics. In the 1918 General Election he won the Battersea South seat, standing for the Conservative Party. When the RNVR was reconstituted in 1921 Viscount Curzon resumed his position as the commanding officer of the Sussex division with the rank of Captain; he was to hold this appointment until the RNVR was mobilised again in September 1939 on the outbreak of World War II. Following his father's death in 1929 Francis Curzon ascended to the title Earl Howe, making him ineligible for Parliamentary re-election. He was appointed a Privy Counsellor in the 1929 Dissolution Honours. However, during his later years as an MP Curzon had begun to become involved in motor racing. An associate of the Bentley Boys, he was instrumental in forming the ideas which led Dudley Benjafield to set up the British Racing Drivers' Club in 1928. The newly ennobled Earl Howe was elected its president at the BRDC's first Annual General Meeting in 1929.

Motor racing career
Francis Curzon made his race debut at the comparatively old age of 44, in the 1928 Irish TT with a Bugatti Type 43. After leaving the House of Commons he pursued his driving career with increasing vigour. During the 1930s he became a well known driver, competing in many national and international races, most notably the 24 Hours of Le Mans. He entered the endurance classic six times between 1929 and 1935, only missing the 1933 event. For the first year he was entered as a part of the Bentley factory team; but he later entered his own cars, as Bentley was taken over by Rolls-Royce in 1931 and withdrew from motor racing. Driving his own Alfa Romeo 6C with co-driver Leslie Callingham he won the 2-litre class at the 1930 race. He upgraded to an Alfa Romeo 8C for the 1931 24 Hours of Le Mans, and won the race outright driving in partnership with Henry Birkin.

Away from La Sarthe, Earl Howe (as he was most commonly entered following his father's death) drove in a variety of automobiles. Indeed, in the mid-1930s he was credited by Time magazine as having "Europe's most elaborate" collection of racing cars. Although patriotic, he was often forced to buy and run cars built outside the UK, as once Bentley had withdrawn from motor sport there were no realistically competitive British-built machines available. He favored the Bugatti marque, owning and campaigning several Bugattis. He won the Donington Park Trophy race in 1933, and added to his victory haul with a win in the 1938 Grosvenor Grand Prix, at Cape Town in South Africa. In addition to these two victories he also took podium finishes in eleven other major races between 1933 and 1939, and became one of only two men to have competed in every running of the RAC Tourist Trophy on the Ards Circuit, the other being E.R. Hall.

In 1937, Howe was seriously injured in an accident driving his pale blue and silver – Howe's personal racing colours – English Racing Automobiles R8B, while challenging the Thai Royal family competitor Prince Bira for the lead in the Campbell Trophy at the Brooklands circuit.

Aside from assuming the Presidency of the BRDC, Earl Howe also served as Vice-President of the FIA's Commission Sportive Internationale, the governing body of international motorsport at the time. He also kept motorsport issues on the political landscape, with numerous speeches in the House of Lords.

Post-war career
 
The start of the Second World War effectively ended Earl Howe's front line driving career, and he returned to the Navy with the rank of commodore. At the end of the conflict he moved into race organising, although he continued to prepare and enter cars for other drivers, including Tazio Nuvolari. As President of the BRDC and Patron of the newly formed 500 Club, he was instrumental in the resumption of motor racing and applied political pressure to allow airfields to be used for motor sport. He was involved with his friend and associate Peter Fulke Greville organising the first British Grand Prix, at Silverstone in 1948, which gained full Formula One World Championship status at the Championship's inception in 1950. He also instituted the annual BRDC International Trophy meeting at the same circuit. Under Earl Howe's 35-year stewardship, the BRDC went from private dining club to one of the most successful and high-profile motor sport associations in the world.

The Earl Howe Trophy

Today the BRDC maintains a highly prestigious award in his memory: The Earl Howe Trophy. Until 2018 this was awarded annually "to the highest placed British Driver in the Indy 500 race or to the British driver who has established the most meritorious performance of the year in North America". The winning criteria were subjective and were determined at the discretion of the awarding panel. In 2016 the winner was Ed Jones, the Dubai-born driver who won the 2016 Indy Lights series, while no British driver finished within the top ten of the 2016 Indianapolis 500. In 2017, the Earl Howe Trophy winner was Sam Bird, who won both races at the USA round of the Formula E world championship: the 2017 New York City ePrix. In contrast to the previous year, two British drivers had finished in the top ten at Indianapolis – Jones (third) and Max Chilton (fourth) – with Chilton also leading the most laps during the race. Previously, Justin Wilson won the 2013 award having finished in fifth place at that year's Indianapolis 500 event.

From 2019, the award has been made to "the most outstanding performance of the year in Historic racing". The inaugural winners under the new criteria were Philip Walker and Gordon Shedden who, together with co-driver Miles Griffiths, won the 2019 Spa Six Hours historic endurance race.

Personal life
Francis Curzon was the son of Richard Curzon, 4th Earl Howe, and his wife Lady Georgiana Elizabeth Spencer-Churchill.

On 28 October 1907 he married his first cousin Mary Curzon (30 October 1887 – 1 September 1962), daughter of The Hon. Montagu Curzon and wife Esmé FitzRoy. They divorced in 1937. 
A daughter, (by Sybil Boyter Johnson) Lady Sarah Curzon (born 25 January 1945), married Formula One driver Piers Courage. After Courage's death in the 1970 Dutch Grand Prix, she married John Aspinall. 
Another daughter (by Mary Curzon) Lady Georgiana Curzon married Home Kidston, a Royal Navy officer, farmer and racing driver.

Francis Curzon, 5th Earl Howe died in July 1964. He was succeeded by his eldest son, Edward.

Racing record

Complete 24 Hours of Le Mans results

Complete European Championship results
(key) (Races in bold indicate pole position) (Races in italics indicate fastest lap)

Honours and medals
Commander of the Order of the British Empire (CBE)
British War Medal
Victory Medal
1939-1945 Star
Defense Medal
War Medal 1939-1945
King George V Coronation Medal
King George V Silver Jubilee Medal
King George VI Coronation Medal
Queen Elizabeth II Coronation Medal
Reserve Decoration

See also 
 Bugatti Type 57S Atalante number 57502

References

Footnotes

Other sources

 Francis Curzon profile at The 500 Owners Association

External links 

 

1884 births
1964 deaths
5
Royal Navy officers of World War II
English racing drivers
Grand Prix drivers
24 Hours of Le Mans drivers
24 Hours of Le Mans winning drivers
Brighton Speed Trials people
Curzon, Francis
Curzon, Francis
Curzon, Francis
Curzon, Francis
Curzon, Francis
Howe, E5
BRDC Gold Star winners
Commanders of the Order of the British Empire
Members of the Privy Council of the United Kingdom
Royal Navy officers of World War I
Francis
Francis
Presidents of international sport federations
Royal Naval Volunteer Reserve personnel of World War I
Royal Naval Volunteer Reserve personnel of World War II
British sportsperson-politicians
European Championship drivers
Royal Naval Reserve personnel